Takyi is an Akan (fante tribes) surname. Notable people with the  Akan surname include:

Charles Takyi (born 1984), Ghanaian footballer
Frances Takyi-Mensah (born 1986), Ghanaian beauty pageant winner
Prince Nana (footballer) (born 1983), Danish-Ghanaian footballer

See also
 Tacky's War, uprising of black African slaves that occurred in Jamaica in May, June and July 1760.

Surnames of Ashanti origin
Surnames of Akan origin